Jayanta Meher, born on 13 June 1986), is a young Artist of Odisha Pattachitra painting. He was born in Sonepur and lives in Bolangir, Odisha.

Early life and family

Jayanta Meher is the younger son of famous artist Padmashree Kailash Chandra Meher. He learned painting from his parents. All members of his family are well-known artists.

Career

He was 10 years old when he started learning this craft. He won the Master Craftsman National Award in the year 2001. He participated in many exhibitions across India and abroad.

References 

1986 births
Living people
Indian male painters
People from Subarnapur district
20th-century Indian painters
Sambalpur University alumni
20th-century Indian male artists